Mohamad Muhaimin bin Mohamad (born 14 November 1991) is a Malaysian footballer who plays for Malaysia Super League club Negeri Sembilan as a goalkeeper.

Club Career 
In 2021 he joined the team Negeri Sembilan FC on a free transfer. Has been with the team for two years and has become a backup goalkeeper throughout 2022. He has helped the team secure fourth place in the Malaysia Super League in 2022. It is an impressive achievement as the team has just been promoted from the Malaysia Premier League in the previous year and had shocked the other Malaysia Super League teams as Negeri Sembilan FC was considered an underdog team. He has made 5 appearances during his time with Negeri Sembilan FC.

References

External links
 

1991 births
Living people
Malaysian footballers
Malaysia Premier League players
Malaysia Super League players
PKNS F.C. players
MOF F.C. players
Kedah Darul Aman F.C. players
Negeri Sembilan FC players
Petaling Jaya City FC players
Association football goalkeepers